Nazir Hussain (15 May 1922 – 16 October 1987) was an Indian actor, director and screenwriter. He was famous as a character actor in Hindi cinema and acted in almost 500 films. Dev Anand starred in a large proportion of the films he acted in.

Early life

Nazir Hussain's father Shahabzad Khan was a guard in the Railways and Hussain grew up in Lucknow. He himself worked as a fireman in the railways for few months and soon joined the British army during World War II. He was posted in Malaysia and Singapore where he became a prisoner of war. After being freed, he came under the influence of Subhas Chandra Bose and joined the Indian National Army (INA). He was accorded the status of freedom fighter and was given a free railway pass for life.

Film career

After the INA, unable to find jobs, he began performing in plays. B. N. Sircar of New Theatres, impressed by his performance, called him to Calcutta to join New Theatres. In Calcutta, he met Bimal Roy and became his assistant. He joined with Bimal Roy to make the film Pahela Aadmi, based on the INA experience. He not only acted in the film, but also wrote the story and co-wrote the dialogues for the film. Pehla Aadmi was released in 1950 and launched him to stardom and he became a permanent fixture in Bimal Roy's movies. Later, he worked in many socialist themed films such as Do Bigha Zamin, Devdas and Naya Daur. Munimji, a 1955 Indian Hindi movie was the first film he did with actor Dev Anand. The story idea was by Ranjan, and screenplay and dialogues by Nazir Hussain. The team of Mukherjee, Nazir Hussain, Dev Anand and music director S.D. Burman later collaborated to produce another movie, Paying Guest, in 1957. Main Sunder Hoon is a 1971 Hindi language drama film directed by R. Krishnan and Nazir Hussain.

Bhojpuri cinema

Hussain discussed the possibility of a Bhojpuri cinema industry with Indian president Rajendra Prasad. He is considered as the Pitamah of Bhojpuri cinema. Hussain created Ganga Maiyya Tohe Piyari Chadhaibo (1963), the first Bhojpuri film. Nazir turned producer with Bhojpuri film Hamaar Sansar and also directed it. Hussain was also known for the hit Bhojpuri film Balam Pardesia in the late 1970s.

Filmography

Associations
Nazir has worked with several eminent actors and actresses of Hindi cinema.

References

External links

Male actors in Bhojpuri cinema
Film producers from Uttar Pradesh
Hindi-language film directors
Filmfare Awards winners
1922 births
1987 deaths
Male actors in Hindi cinema
20th-century Indian film directors
Male actors from Uttar Pradesh
People from Ghazipur
Indian male film actors